A confessional is a box, cabinet, booth, or stall in which the priest in some Catholic churches sits to hear the confessions of penitents. It is the usual venue for the sacrament in the Roman Catholic Church and the Lutheran Churches, but similar structures are also used in Anglican churches of an Anglo-Catholic orientation.  In the Catholic Church, confessions are only to be heard in a confessional or oratory, except for a just reason.

The confessional is usually a wooden structure, with a centre compartment—entered through a door or curtain—in which the priest sits, and on each side there is a latticed opening for the penitents to speak through and a step on which they kneel. By this arrangement the priest is hidden, but the penitent is visible to the public. Confessionals sometimes form part of the architectural scheme of the church; many finely decorated specimens, dating from the late 16th and the 17th centuries, are found in churches on the continent of Europe. But more usually, confessionals are movable pieces of furniture.

In modern practice of the Catholic, Lutheran and Anglican churches, apart from receiving absolution in the confessional, many churches offer private Confession and Absolution at the chancel rails or in a reconciliation room, as well as during communal penitential rites.

In Eastern Orthodoxy and Oriental Orthodoxy confessionals are not used: the confession often occurs in sight of other believers, e.g., those waiting in the row for the same purpose, but at some distance from them to not break the seal of confession.

History
The confessional in its modern form dates no farther back than the 16th century, and Du Cange cites the year 1563 for an early use of the word confessionale for the sacrum poenitentiae tribunal. Originally the term was applied to the place where a martyr or "confessor" (in the sense of one who confesses Christ) had been buried. There are, however, instances (e.g. the confessional of Church of St. Trophime at Arles) where the name was attached to the spot, whether cell or seat, where noted saints had a habit of hearing confessions. In the popular Reformed view confessional boxes are associated with the scandals, real or supposed, of the practice of auricular confession. They were, however, devised to guard against such scandals by securing at once essential publicity and a reasonable privacy, and by separating priest and penitent. In the Middle Ages stringent rules were laid down, in this latter respect, by the canon law in the case of confessions by women and especially nuns. In England, before the Protestant Reformation, publicity was reckoned the best safeguard. Thus Archbishop Walter Reynolds, in 1322, says in his Constitutions: "Let the priest choose for himself a common place for hearing confessions, where he may be seen generally by all in the church; and do not let him hear any one, and especially any woman, in a private place, except in great necessity."

It would seem that the priest usually heard confessions at the chancel opening or at a bench end in the nave near the chancel. There is, however, in some churchwardens' accounts mention of a special seat: "the shryving stool", "shriving pew" or "shriving place" (on a related note, the observance of Shrove Tuesday is named after the practice of shriving/confession). At Lenham in Kent there is an ancient armchair in stone, with a stone bench and steps on one side, which appears to be a confessional. With the revival of the practice of auricular confession in the Church of England, confessionals were introduced into some parishes with an Anglo-Catholic bent. Since, however, they formed no part of "the furniture of the church" in the "second year of King Edward VI", some have argued that they are not covered by the "Ornaments Rubric" in the Prayer-Book. The question of their legality was raised in 1900 in the case of Davey v. Hinde (vicar of the Church of the Annunciation at Brighton) tried before Dr Tristram in the consistory court of Chichester. They were condemned "on the ground that they are not articles of church furniture requisite for or conducive to conformity with the doctrine or practice of the Church of England in relation to the reception of confession".

"Confessional", in the sense of a due payable for the right to hear confession, is now obsolete.

Gallery

See also
sub rosa

References

External links

Confession (religion)
Church architecture